The Derby du Languedoc is a football match contested between French clubs Nîmes Olympique and Montpellier HSC. The name of the derby derives from the fact that Nîmes and Montpellier are the two major clubs in France that are located in the former region of Languedoc-Roussillon.

History 
The distance between the two cities (about fifty kilometers) accentuates the rivalry. Nîmes Olympique was considered the best club in the region from the 1950s until the early 1980s. This leadership is challenged by the rise of Montpellier HSC in the 1970s. The club gradually weakens Nîmes by recovering many important players like Louis Landi, Michel Mézy or the coach Kader Firoud.

Players who played for both clubs 

Players currently playing for their respective Derby du Languedoc club are written in bold.

References

External links
  Nîmes Olympique Official Site
  Montpellier Official Site

French football derbies
Nîmes Olympique
Montpellier HSC
Football in Occitania (administrative region)
1937 establishments in France
Recurring sporting events established in 1937